Live Underground 2002 is a live DVD and documentary film by American rock band Comes with the Fall. Before its release, the band put out a companion CD featuring the same live performance titled Live 2002.

Track listing

Personnel
Comes with the Fall
Bevan Davies — drums
William DuVall — vocals, guitar
Adam Stanger — bass guitar
Production
 Christopher Horvath - engineering
 Russ Fowler - mixing
 Alex Lowe - mastering
 Josh Paul - live sound engineering
 William DuVall - production

References

External links

American documentary films
Comes with the Fall albums
2000s English-language films
Live video albums